Robert Edward Mitchell is an American historian, currently the Marcello Lotti Professor of English at Duke University.

References

Year of birth missing (living people)
Living people
Duke University faculty
21st-century American historians
21st-century American male writers
American male non-fiction writers